Por Vos Muero is the 15th studio album by Latin Grammy-winning Spanish musician and actor Miguel Bosé. It was released in April 2004.

Track listing
 "El Ilusionista"
 "Olvidame tu"
 "Levantate y olvida"
 "Amiga (gracias por venir...)"
 "A una dama"
 "Amiga"
 "Vagabundo"
 "De momento no"
 "Habana"
 "Por vos muero"

2004 albums
Miguel Bosé albums